The Odéon-Théâtre de l'Europe (formerly the Théâtre de l'Odéon)  is one of France's six national theatres.  It is located at 2 rue Corneille in the 6th arrondissement of Paris on the left bank of the Seine, next to the Luxembourg Garden and the Luxembourg Palace, which houses the Senate.

First theatre
The original building, the Salle du Faubourg Saint-Germain, was constructed for the Théâtre Français between 1779 and 1782 to a Neoclassical design by Charles De Wailly and Marie-Joseph Peyre. The site was in the garden of the former Hôtel de Condé. The new theatre was inaugurated by Marie-Antoinette on April 9, 1782. It was there that Beaumarchais' play The Marriage of Figaro was premiered two years later. On April 27, 1791, during the Revolution, the company split. The players sympathetic to the crown remained in the theatre in the Faubourg Saint-Germain. They were arrested and incarcerated on the night of September 3, 1793, but were allowed to return a year later. In 1797, the theater was remodeled by the architect Jean-François Leclerc and became known as the Odéon, but it was destroyed by a fire on March 18, 1799.

Second theatre
An 1808 reconstruction of the theater designed by Jean Chalgrin (architect of the Arc de Triomphe) was officially named the Théâtre de l'Impératrice, but everyone still called it the Odéon. It burned down in 1818.

Third theatre
The third and present structure, designed by Pierre Thomas Baraguay, was opened in September 1819. In 1990, the theater was given the sobriquet 'Théâtre de l'Europe'. It is a member theater of the Union of the Theatres of Europe.

Access

The Line 4 and Line 10 serves Odéon station.

See also
 Hôtel de Condé, previously on the same location

Notes

Bibliography
 Carlson, Marvin (1966). The Theatre of the French Revolution. Ithaca: Cornell University Press. .
 Hemmings, F. W. J. (1994). Theatre and State in France, 1760–1905. New York: Cambridge University Press.  (2006 reprint).
 Wild, Nicole (2012). Dictionnaire des théâtres parisiens (1807–1914). Lyon: Symétrie. . .

External links
  Official website

Buildings and structures in the 6th arrondissement of Paris
Theatres in Paris
1782 establishments in France
National theatres
Terminating vistas in Paris